Stavros Diamantopoulos (born 4 August 1947) is a Greek football player and manager.

He played for Pierikos.

He managed Pierikos, PAS Giannina, Levadiakos, Edessaikos, Olympiacos, Aris, Panachaiki, AEL 1964 FC, Naoussa, Olympiakos Volou 1937, Kozani, Niki Volos and Kastoria.

References

1947 births
Living people
Greek footballers
Greek football managers
Olympiacos F.C. managers
Aris Thessaloniki F.C. managers
Niki Volos F.C. managers
Olympiacos Volos F.C. managers
Athlitiki Enosi Larissa F.C. managers
PAS Giannina F.C. managers
Kozani F.C. managers
Association football midfielders
People from Kavala (regional unit)
Footballers from Eastern Macedonia and Thrace